Operation Blowdown was an explosives test carried out in the Kutini-Payamu jungle of Australia's Cape York Peninsula in 1963, to simulate the effects of a nuclear weapon on tropical rainforest. It was conducted by the Australian Army, the Department of Supply, and the Defence Standards Laboratory with participation from the United Kingdom, Canada and United States. In addition, blast effects on military material, field fortifications, supply points, and foot and vehicle movement were examined in a rain forest environment.

After the explosion, troops were moved through the area (which was now covered in up to a metre of leaf litter), to test their ability to transit across the debris. In addition, obsolete vehicles and equipment left near the center of the explosion were destroyed.

Although never officially stated, there is speculation that the test intended to determine the feasibility of using nuclear weapons in clearing the jungles of Vietnam, at a time of Australia's increasing involvement in the Vietnam war starting in 1962.

United States participation included the establishment of pressure measurement equipment and the loan of photographic and instrumentation equipment, some of which had been used in the 1962 Project Plowshare.

Preparations

The construction of the base camp and test area was provided in part by the 24th Construction Squadron, Royal Australian Engineers. At ground zero, a straight sided tower was constructed to suspend a sphere of TNT charges. The charges were tins of 41 pounds of remelted and cast TNT from 155-mm shells. Extreme care needed to be taken during construction since damage or air gaps might have caused jetting or deformation of the blast wave.

The section of rainforest selected was typical of North Queensland and contained 70 different tree species of varying sizes. Four lanes centered on the tower were set up with instrumentation and one 200-foot wide lane was cleared of vegetation except for select trees to study the impact with varying distances from ground zero. Furthermore, approximately 17,000 trees were catalogued to determine the effects of the blast. Military equipment including light and heavy weapons, mortar pits, ammunition, trenches, aerial masts, wireless communication equipment and cables were also positioned around the blast site, complete with simulated troops.

Blast effects
At 8:30 am Eastern Australian time,  were detonated flattening a considerable area of the test site. The effects of overpressure are summarized by the following table. This also helps in understanding how a test of 50 tons could be used to evaluate nuclear weapons which may be in the kiloton and megaton ranges by reducing the distance to ground zero for greater effect.

See also
 Operation Sailor Hat
 Tunguska event, see images of blown down trees.
 Bush Tucker Man, Les J. Hiddens visits the site in one of his program's episodes. There is little to no evidence of the test but he discusses it briefly.

References

External links
  There were similar forest blast operations conducted in Canada codenamed:Distant Plain, events 1-5

Explosions in 1963
Blowdown
Australia–United Kingdom relations
Australia–United States relations
1963 in Australia
Blowdown
July 1963 events in Australia